Trigonopterus honjensis is a species of flightless weevil in the genus Trigonopterus from Indonesia.

Etymology
The specific name is derived from that of the type locality.

Description
Individuals measure 1.99–2.22 mm in length.  The body is slightly oval in shape.  General coloration is rust-colored.

Range

References

honjensis
Beetles described in 2014
Beetles of Asia
Insects of Indonesia